Play! is an upcoming pavilion, which was scheduled to open at Epcot by the spring of 2023. It will be built in the former Wonders of Life pavilion and will be themed like an interactive city in which guests will be able to interact with their favorite Disney characters.

Overview
According to /Film the pavilion will contain:
Animation Academy- Guests will help Edna Mode with uninspired style.
Hotel Heist- An interactive game hosted by Judy Hopps and Nick Wilde from Zootopia.
Arcade
Monorail Mark X
A water balloon throwing game with Huey, Dewey, and Louie, and Webby Vanderquack, alongside other Disney characters.

Other potential attractions include meet and greets for Wreck-It-Ralph, Vanellope, Joy, Sadness and Baymax.

References

Walt Disney Parks and Resorts attractions
Epcot
Future World (Epcot)
World Discovery